In fluid dynamics, the reyn is a British unit of dynamic viscosity,
named in honour of Osbourne Reynolds, for whom the Reynolds number is also named.

Conversions
By definition,
1 reyn = 1 lbf s in−2.
It follows that the relation between the reyn and the poise is approximately
1 reyn = 6.89476 × 104 P.

In SI units, viscosity is expressed in newton-seconds per square meter, or equivalently in pascal-seconds. The conversion factor between the two is approximately
1 reyn = 6890 Pa s.

References

External links
 Reyn History of the unit

Fluid dynamics
Units of dynamic viscosity